DigitalBridge Group, Inc. is a global digital infrastructure investment firm. The company owns, invests in and operates businesses such as cell towers, data centers, fiber, small cells, and edge infrastructure. Headquartered in Boca Raton, DigitalBridge has key offices in Los Angeles, New York, London, and Singapore.

In 2010, DigitalBridge, then still Colony Capital, was reported to manage about $30 billion in investments. In 2011, DigitalBridge was tied for 3rd largest private equity real estate fund in the world, behind Blackstone Group and Morgan Stanley Real Estate.

History

Early investments
Colony purchased Raffles International on July 18, 2005.  This included the 41 hotels and resorts operated under the Raffles Hotel and Swissotel brand names. On January 30, 2006, it acquired Fairmont Hotels and Resorts of Toronto, Ontario with Kingdom Hotels International as a joint partner for US$3.24 billion. On April 10, 2006, it acquired French professional football team Paris Saint-Germain.

On February 25, 2007, it signed a definitive agreement to take Station Casinos private in a 75%/25% split with members of the founding Fertitta family for US$5.5 billion, or US$90/share.  The subsequent economic downturn caused Station Casinos to declare bankruptcy in 2009, and when it emerged in 2011 Colony Capital owned a much smaller portion after providing more cash. Founder, Chairman, and CEO Thomas Barrack said it "could have been the worst investment ever" in terms of timing.

On November 11, 2008, Michael Jackson transferred the title of his 2,700 acre estate Neverland Ranch to Sycamore Valley Ranch Company LLC, a joint venture between Jackson (represented by attorney, L. Londell McMillan) and an affiliate of Colony Capital. It is still unclear whether Colony Capital has a part in the property. Jackson earned a total of US$35 million when he agreed to the joint venture between himself and Colony Capital.

In March 2010, Colony arranged a financing and marketing package for Annie Leibovitz. The New York celebrity photographer had been in financial difficulty and in danger of losing to her previous lender, ArtCapital, the rights to her photographs and negatives and her three Greenwich Village townhouses. ArtCapital's credit was for $24 million. In December 2010, Colony purchased Miramax from Disney with Qatar Investment Authority, Tutor-Saliba Corporation and The Weinstein Company as part of a joint venture called Filmyard Holdings for $663 million.

Recent investments
In January 2017, Colony NorthStar, Inc. (NYSE: CLNS) was formed through a tri-party merger between Colony Capital, Inc. (NYSE:CLNY), NorthStar Asset Management Group Inc. (NYSE:NSAM) and NorthStar Realty Finance Corp. (NYSE:NRF).

In September 2017, Colony NorthStar agreed to sell its Townsend Group unit to Aon for $475 million.

In October 2017, Colony entered discussions to purchase The Weinstein Company, a movie and TV production studio that sustained damage after its co-founder, Harvey Weinstein, was accused of multiple counts of sexual harassment over three decades. In the wake of the Harvey Weinstein sexual assault scandal, in late October 2017, it was reported that Colony Capital LLC had proved hesitant to purchase Weinstein Co. after a week of exclusive negotiations. Fortress Investment Group was also in talks to provide a loan to Weinstein Co.

In June 2018, The New York Times reported that Colony North Star had raised more than $7 billion in investments since Donald Trump won the 2016 presidential election. 24 percent of the money came from the United Arab Emirates and Saudi Arabia.

In April 2022, DigitalBridge bought out Wafra’s stake in its investment management subsidiary for $800 million and switched from REIT to traditional C-Corp.  DigitalBridge announced and initiated several acquisitions during 2022 including AMP Capital's global infrastructure equity investment management business for $328 million and Switch, Inc., a data center company, for $11 billion. The firm 
sold 27 percent of its stake in DataBank to Swiss Life and EDF Invest for $1.2 billion. DigitalBridge said it would own 15.5 percent of DataBank after the sale.

Leadership

Senior Executives 
 Marc Ganzi - Chief Executive Officer  
 Ronald M. Sanders - Executive Vice President, Chief Legal Officer & Secretary
 Ben Jenkins - President and Chief Investment Officer
 Jacky Wu - Executive Vice President, Chief Financial Officer & Treasurer

References

External links
 

Private equity firms of the United States
Real estate companies of the United States
Financial services companies based in California
Companies based in Los Angeles
American companies established in 1991
Financial services companies established in 1991
1991 establishments in California
Companies listed on the New York Stock Exchange
2022 mergers and acquisitions